HMS Quail was a B-class torpedo boat destroyer of the British Royal Navy. She was launched by Laird Brothers, Birkenhead, on 24 September 1895.  She served in home waters and the West Indies for several years, her robust structure proved by surviving at least one heavy collision.  She served during the Great War, and was sold off after the hostilities end, on 23 July 1919.  She gave her name to the four strong group of Quail-class destroyers.

Design and construction
HMS Quail was one of four 30-knot destroyers ordered from Laird's as part of the 1894–1895 Royal Navy shipbuilding programme. As with other early Royal Navy destroyers, the detailed design of Quail was left to the builder, with the Admiralty laying down only broad requirements. She carried the specified armament for the thirty-knotters of a QF 12 pounder 12 cwt ( calibre) gun on a platform on the ship's conning tower (in practice the platform was also used as the ship's bridge), with a secondary armament of five 6-pounder guns, and two 18-inch (450 mm) torpedo tubes.

Quail was laid down as Yard No 606 on 28 May 1895, and was launched on 24 September 1895. Quail commissioned in June 1897.

Service
Newly commissioned, Quail took part in the naval review off Spithead on 26 June 1897 to celebrate the Diamond Jubilee of Queen Victoria. In service, Quail proved to be a strongly-built ship, and a good seaboat, although, like other Laird-built 30-knot destroyers, manoeuvrability was poor, with a wide turning circle.

Quail was sent to the North America and West Indies Station, based at Bermuda, being on station when the Spanish–American War broke out in 1898. She took part in the Anglo-German naval blockade of Venezuela during the Venezuela Crisis of 1902–03. Quail returned to home waters in 1903, joining the Mediterranean Fleet in October 1904, and returning to the United Kingdom in 1906.

On 7 August 1907, Quail was involved in a collision with the scout cruiser HMS Attentive, badly damaging her bow. On 30 May 1910, Quail collided with the British fishing trawler Olivia off Porthallow, Cornwall, England, killing four men from the village of Flushing, Cornwall, aboard Olivia. Quail was a member of the Fifth Destroyer Flotilla, based at Devonport, in 1910, and was still a member of the Fifth Flotilla in 1913.

On 30 August 1912 the Admiralty directed all destroyers were to be grouped into classes designated by letters based on contract speed and appearance. As a four-funneled 30-knotter destroyer, Quail was assigned to the B Class.

HMS Quail formed part of the Seventh Destroyer Flotilla based on the Humber on the outbreak of the First World War, continuing operations until the end of the war. She was sold for breaking up on 23 July 1919.

Notes

Citations

Bibliography

 

 

Quail-class destroyers
Ships built on the River Mersey
1895 ships
B-class destroyers (1913)
Maritime incidents in 1907
Maritime incidents in 1910
World War I destroyers of the United Kingdom